The X International Chopin Piano Competition was held from 1 to 20 October 1980 in Warsaw. Đặng Thái Sơn, who in the final played with an orchestra for the first time in his life, won first prize, becoming the first pianist from Asia to do so. The elimination of Ivo Pogorelić after the third stage was a great source of controversy.

Awards 
The competition consisted of three elimination stages and a final with seven pianists.

The following prizes were awarded:

Three special prizes were awarded:

Jury 
The jury consisted of:
  Martha Argerich ( VII)
  Paul Badura-Skoda
  
  Josep Colom
  Halina Czerny-Stefańska ( IV)
  Sergei Dorensky
  Jan Ekier
  Liuba Enczewa
  Rudolf Fischer
  Lidia Grychtołówna
  Iving Heller
  Rex Hobcroft
  
  Andrzej Jasiński
  Geneviève Joy
  Louis Kentner
  Kazimierz Kord (chairman)
  Eugene List
  Nikita Magaloff (vice-chairman)
  Frantisek Rauch (vice-chairman)
  Regina Smendzianka
  
  
  
  Tadeusz Żmudziński

Pogorelić Scandal 
There was a sensation at the 1980 Chopin Competition in Warsaw when, in a decision going against audience opinion, Ivo Pogorelić was not admitted to the final round because of his unconventional interpretations. This came about because of a wide discrepancy in the jury’s marking; half the panel of judges gave him the highest number of points and half the lowest. He was awarded only a special prize for his “exceptionally original pianistic talent”. Others were less fond of his less traditional style of play. 

Jury member Eugene List explained: "I'm the first to say that the boy is very talented [...] but I voted very low for him. This is a special kind of competition. It's only Chopin. He doesn't respect the music. He uses extremes to the point of distortion. And he puts on too much of an act." Louis Kentner resigned after the first stage after all of his students had been eliminated from the competition, saying that "if people like Pogorelić make it to the second stage, I cannot participate in the work of the jury. We have different aesthetic criteria."

In the third stage, Pogorelić once again caused controversy, performing his program in the wrong order, leaving the stage part way through, and wearing an extravagant concert attire that made him look like "a prince dropped in the middle of the desert". In the end, Pogorelić was not admitted into the final. Martha Argerich resigned in protest, proclaiming him a "genius" who "her colleagues could not appreciate because of an entrenched conservatism", which is "why she was ashamed to be associated with them". Nikita Magaloff and Paul Badura-Skoda announced their solidarity with Argerich, though coming short of resigning themselves, declaring that it was "unthinkable that such an artist should not make it to the finals". According to Đặng Thái Sơn, the eventual winner, Argerich still sent a public telegram to Warsaw to congratulate him, after learning the final results.

Pogorelić later accused in a one-sided interview in 1993, claiming that "The Soviet Bloc authorities had decided months before the competition that it was politically necessary to have a North Vietnamese winner. My decision to participate was not at all welcome. I was told I should wait a year, for the Tchaikovsky competition, when I would have the first prize guaranteed." In 2008, he demanded an official inquiry into the jury decisions of the 1980 competition, however, the Chopin Institute refused to reopen the case.

References

Further reading

External links 
 

 

International Chopin Piano Competition
1980 in music
1980 in Poland
1980s in Warsaw
October 1980 events in Europe